The 1986 Austral-Asia Cup Final was a One Day International (ODI) match played on 18 April 1986 between India and Pakistan at the Sharjah Cricket Stadium, Sharjah. It marked the culmination of the first Austral-Asia Cup and was won by Pakistan who defeated India by one wicket to lift their first ODI trophy.

Road to the final
India reached the final by defeating Sri Lanka by seven wickets, while Pakistan reached the final by defeating New Zealand by ten wickets.

Details
Heading into the match, Pakistan remained unchanged from their semi-final victory over New Zealand while India made one change with Dilip Vengsarkar replacing Sandeep Patil from their victory over Sri Lanka. Imran Khan won the toss and elected to field first. Openers Krishnamachari Srikkanth and Sunil Gavaskar opened with a 117 run partnership before Krishnamachari Srikkanth attempt for a six was caught by Wasim Akram. Dilip Vengsarkar scored a half-century before being clean bowled by Wasim Akram with the score at 216. The scorecard remained the same as Kirti Azad was sent back by Akram for no score. Kapil Dev struck a boundary before being bowled by Imran Khan, who dismissed Sunil Gavaskar as well, with Gavaskar only being eight runs shy of a century. Later India lost quick wickets of Ravi Shastri and Chetan Sharma and India finished on 245 for 7 from their fifty overs with the last eights overs getting them only 38 runs. For Pakistan, Wasim Akram was the best of the bowlers with three wickets while Imran Khan claimed two wickets.

Chasing the target of 246 to win, Pakistan lost in-form batsman Mudassar Nazar leg before wicket to Chetan Sharma with the total at nine. New man Rameez Raja also couldn't make a good score as he was dismissed by Maninder Singh for ten. Javed Miandad pushed the score slowly along with opener Mohsin Khan. Madan Lal clean bowled Khan for 36 with the scorecard at 61 for 3. Miandad built good partnerships with Saleem Malik and later Abdul Qadir, who made a quick 34, before being caught by substitute fielder Raman Lamba. Still Pakistan were 67 runs away from victory. Imran Khan and Manzoor Elahi perished while going for big hits, but Miandad was moving the score at one end, trying to maintain the asking rate with occasional boundaries and sixes.

At the end of 49th over, Pakistan were 235 for seven and required 11 runs from six balls to win the cup. Chetan Sharma was bowling the 50th over of the match and Miandad struck the first ball to the long-off boundary, but Kapil fielded it and returned the ball quickly and Wasim Akram was run out trying to get the second run. Miandad struck a boundary off the second ball but could score only a single in the third ball, as Roger Binny brilliantly stopped a possible boundary. Wicket-keeper batsman Zuldarnain was clean bowled by Sharma for a duck which left Pakistan needing five runs from two deliveries. Last man Tauseef Ahmed scrambled a single off the fifth ball as Mohammad Azharuddin missed a clean run-out chance. Pakistan needing four runs and India one final wicket from the last ball. Chetan Sharma's intended yorker became a full toss which was dispatched into crowds by Miandad for a six. Pakistan finished on 248 for 9 with Miandad remained unbeaten on 116 as he helped Pakistan to win their maiden One Day trophy. For India, Chetan Sharma was the best of the bowlers with three wickets while Madan Lal claimed two wickets. Javed Miandad was adjudged the man of the match while Sunil Gavaskar was declared the Man of the Series.

Scorecard

Fall of wickets: 1–117 (Srikkanth), 2–216 (Vengsarkar), 3–216 (Kirti Azad), 4–229 (Kapil Dev), 5–242 (Sunil Gavaskar), 6–245 (Ravi Shastri), 7–245 (Chetan Sharma)

Fall of wickets: 1–9 (Mudassar Nazar), 2–39 (Rameez Raja), 3–61 (Mohsin Khan), 4–110 (Saleem Malik), 5–181 (Abdul Qadir), 6–209 (Imran Khan), 7–215 (Manzoor Elahi), 8–236 (Wasim Akram), 9–241 (Zulqarnain)

References

External links
Cricinfo – Austral-Asia Cup, 1985/86

1986 in cricket
1986 in Pakistani cricket
1986 in Indian cricket
International cricket competitions from 1985–86 to 1988
Limited overs cricket matches
India–Pakistan cricket rivalry at Finals